This is a list of years in Romania. See also the timeline of Romanian history.  For only articles about years in Romania that have been written, see :Category:Years in Romania.

1989–present 
Years since the December 1989 Romanian Revolution.

1947–1989 
Years between the abdication of King Michael of Romania and the December 1989 Romanian Revolution.

1881–1947 
Years of the Kingdom of Romania and the short-lived National Legionary State (1940–1941).

1859–1881 
Years of the United Principalities.

See also
 Timeline of Romanian history
 Timeline of Iași
 Timeline of Bucharest
 List of years by country

 
Romania history-related lists
Romania